

Major events
, 1710—Ingermanland Governorate was renamed St. Petersburg Governorate after the city of St. Petersburg.
, 1710—all governorates were divided into lots—a new level of grouping above  (courts of ). A "lot" was defined as a unit grouping 5,536 . The process of introducing lots lasted until 1713. As a result, all governorates were subdivided into a total of 146.7 lots.

Subdivisions (as of 1712)
Archangelgorod Governorate (Архангелогородская губерния)
Subdivided into 18.5 lots.
Azov Governorate (Азовская губерния)
Subdivided into 7.5 lots.
Kazan Governorate (Казанская губерния)
Subdivided into 21 lots.
Kiev Governorate (Киевская губерния)
Subdivided into 5 lots.
Moscow Governorate (Московская губерния)
Subdivided into 44.5 lots.
St. Petersburg Governorate (Санкт-Петербургская губерния)
Subdivided into 32.2 lots.
Siberia Governorate (Сибирская губерния)
Subdivided into 9 lots.
Smolensk Governorate (Смоленская губерния)
Subdivided into 9 lots.

References

1710-1713
1710s in Russia